Taimhotep (t3ỉ-ˁỉỉ-m-ḥtp, in Greek: ταιμουθης, Taimuthis; December 17, 73 BCE – February 15, 42 BCE) was an ancient Egyptian woman known from two stelae made during the reign of Cleopatra VII. One of these, a limestone stela from 43 or 42 BCE was found in Memphis or Sakkara and is today in the British Museum (BM 147), the other is a Demotic version of its text; its fragments are also in the British Museum (BM 377).

Stela BM 147 has a depiction of Taimhotep worshipping Sokar-Osiris, Apis, Isis, Nephtys, Horus, Anubis and a symbol of the West. The text on the stela is 21 lines long and tells of Taimhotep's life. She was born in the 9th regnal year of Ptolemy XII Auletes; her father was apja Khahapi, a priest of Ptah, Min, Khnum-Ra and Horus, her mother was Herankh, a musician of the Ptah temple. She had a brother, High Priest Pasherienamun I and a sister called Taneferher, who married each other; a further possible brother is the scribe Horemhotep. In the 23rd regnal year, at the age of fourteen (July 25, 58 BCE) she married the High Priest of Ptah, Pasherienptah III, and had three daughters and a son by him. Her children are named on the stela BM 377: the son Imhotep-Pedubast and the daughters Berenike, Herankh (nicknamed Beludje) and Kheredankh. It is known that Kheredankh was not her daughter, as she was born to Pasherienptah seven years before his marriage to Taimhotep, and her name was inscribed on the stela erroneously in place of her actual third daughter Her'an (nicknamed Tapedibast), whose name can be found on another stela of her father (Ash. M. 1971/18).

After the birth of her third daughter she prayed to Imhotep, an Old Kingdom sage who was deified in later centuries, for a son. Her prayers were answered and her son was born in 46 BCE, the 6th regnal year of Cleopatra VII. Taimhotep died four years later. On her stela Taimhotep laments her untimely death and asks her husband to enjoy life while he can; this is the longest ancient Egyptian text of this kind. From her husband's two stelas it is known that he survived his wife by only one year. Their son Imhotep-Pedubast became High Priest of Ptah in 39 BCE but died young only nine years later.

Sources

1st-century BC Egyptian people
1st-century BC Egyptian women
73 BC births
42 BC deaths